The Balfour Declaration was a 1917 letter which stated the British government's support for the establishment of a Jewish homeland in Palestine.

Balfour Declaration may also refer to:
Balfour Declaration (1926), which granted autonomy to the Dominions of the British Empire

See also
Balfour (disambiguation)